Flat River may refer to:

Rivers 
 Flat River (Northwest Territories), a tributary of the South Nahanni River
 Flat River (Louisiana)
 Flat River (Missouri), a tributary of the Big River
 Flat River (Michigan)
 Flat River (North Carolina)
 Flat River (South Branch Pawtuxet River), a river in Kent County, Rhode Island
 Flat River (Wood River), a river in Kent and Washington County, Rhode Island

Inhabited places 
 Flat River, Missouri, the former name of Park Hills, Missouri